"Live in a Hole" is a song by American heavy metal band Pantera. It was released in 1992 on their album Vulgar Display of Power.

Overview
The song was written in the studio with little demoing and preproduction. Pantera bassist Rex Brown calls the song a "sledgehammer jam" which came to the band quickly and naturally, like most of the songs from the album.
 
The lyrics are about the struggles of individuals with overwhelming social anxiety. They choose to isolate themselves because it's the only answer that seems to work, but at the same time there is still a lack of inner peace within their soul. Because of this, the struggle never seems to end.

Reception
Metal Hammer wrote that the song's "lacerating hooks come from Dimebag's steady succession of devastating riffs, the weird, loping groove in the verses and, predictably, the guitarist's blistering solo midway through". Entertainment Weekly writer Janiss Garza described the song as "psychotic riffing and pounding rhythms".

Personnel
Phil Anselmo – vocals
Dimebag Darrell – guitars
Rex Brown – bass
Vinnie Paul – drums

References

1992 songs
Pantera songs
Songs written by Phil Anselmo
Songs written by Rex Brown
Songs written by Vinnie Paul
Songs written by Dimebag Darrell